This article attempts to list the oldest extant buildings surviving in the state of Georgia in the United States of America, including the oldest houses in Georgia and any other surviving structures. Some dates are approximate and based upon dendochronology, architectural studies, and historical records. With the founding of Savannah in 1733 as a British colony, Georgia was the last and southernmost of the original Thirteen Colonies to be established. A select few surviving buildings date to this colonial period before the American Revolutionary War.
To be listed here a site must:
 date to the year 1799 or prior to; or
 be the oldest building in a county, large city, or oldest of its type (church, government building, etc.)

See also
 List of oldest structures in Atlanta
 List of the oldest buildings in the United States
 National Register of Historic Places listings in Georgia

References

External links 
 

Architecture in Georgia (U.S. state)
Oldest
Georgia